Dawes Crater is located in the Sinus Sabaeus quadrangle of Mars, at 9.2 S and 38 E. It is about  in diameter, and was named after William R. Dawes, a British astronomer (1799–1868) who was ahead of his time in believing that Mars only had a thin atmosphere. Dawes presumed that the atmosphere of Mars was thin because surface markings on the planet could easily be seen.

Description

Impact craters generally have a rim with ejecta around them, in contrast volcanic craters usually do not have a rim or ejecta deposits.  As craters get larger (greater than 10 km in diameter) they usually have a central peak. The peak is caused by a rebound of the crater floor following the impact.  Sometimes craters expose layers that were buried.   Rocks from deep underground are tossed onto the surface.  Hence, craters can show us what lies deep under the surface.

Gallery

See also 
 List of craters on Mars: A-G

References 

Sinus Sabaeus quadrangle
Impact craters on Mars